Can't Hardly Wait is a 1998 American teen romantic comedy film written and directed by Deborah Kaplan and Harry Elfont. It stars an ensemble cast including Ethan Embry, Charlie Korsmo, Lauren Ambrose, Peter Facinelli, Seth Green, and Jennifer Love Hewitt, and is notable for a number of "before-they-were-famous" appearances by teen stars. The story takes place at a high school graduation party in the 1990s.

The film received mixed reviews from critics. It grossed a total of $25 million at the North American domestic box office, against a production budget of $10 million. The soundtrack peaked at number 25 on the Billboard 200 chart.

Concept
The story takes place at a high school graduation party in the late 1990s and in a style much like that of the high school movies of the 1980s. The idea of setting most of the movie at a party was based primarily on concerns to keep production costs low and was also inspired by the movies of John Hughes and the party scene in Say Anything.

The film takes its name from The Replacements' song of the same title, from their 1987 album Pleased to Meet Me, which plays over the film's closing credits.

Plot
In 1998, the senior class of a suburban high school, Huntington Hillside High, are attending a graduation party at a large house owned by a rich class member's family. Among them are Preston Meyers, a typical outsider who plans to proclaim his love to his four-year secret crush Amanda Beckett. Amanda, the most popular girl in school and the senior class prom queen, has recently been dumped by her popular jock boyfriend Mike Dexter. Mike is targeted by nerd classmate William Lichter, who is plotting revenge against him for years of relentless bullying. Preston's antisocial best friend Denise Fleming has no intention of going to the party, but is dragged along by Preston. Kenny Fisher is a wannabe thug who plans on losing his virginity by the end of the night.

Amanda is consoled by her popular girlfriends, whom she realizes she has nothing in common with, and her own second-cousin, who tries to hit on her. She tries to figure out if she has an identity beyond only being known as "Mike Dexter's girlfriend". She discovers a letter addressed to her by Preston and, moved by its contents, makes it her mission to find him, but she doesn't know what he looks like and no one she asks gives any helpful descriptions. Meanwhile, Denise and Kenny wind up locking themselves inside an upstairs bathroom away from the party by accident, where they talk about their old friendship and how they had drifted apart; their conversation leads to the restoration of their friendship and escalates into them having sex.

Later, an intoxicated Mike learns from Trip McNeely—a graduate and former stud from his high school—that in college, guys like them are "a dime a dozen". Trip emphasizes how he dumped his girlfriend in the same fashion that Mike did to "score" with other women and was unsuccessful. Terrified of this prospect, Mike tries to get Amanda back, but she is happier without him and humiliates him in front of everyone at the party. After seeing the school jock turned down, multiple men begin to hit on her, much to her disgust. Preston finds Amanda and confesses his love, but since she still hasn't learned what he looks like, she assumes he is another pervert and rejects him in front of the entire party as well. She later realizes her mistake when she sees Preston's yearbook picture and tries to find him, but he has already driven home in disappointment.

At the same time, William devises his plan to get revenge on Mike and goes into the party to drive Mike out. While inside the party, William begins drinking alcohol to fit in, and drinks enough to make him forget the entire reason he was there. An impromptu sing-along to Guns N' Roses' "Paradise City" causes him to become popular, with multiple women trying desperately to have sex with him. Soon after, William begins talking with Mike, who apologizes for bullying him. William forgives him; the two bond and seemingly become friends. When Mike and William are jailed as a result of a police bust, Mike takes the blame.

The next morning, when William sees Mike and his friends at a diner, he tries to thank Mike for taking the fall. But Mike acts as though he remembers nothing that happened the previous night and ridicules William in front of his friends. Meanwhile, Preston is at a train station about to leave for Boston when Amanda arrives and asks him about the letter. Preston confesses he wrote it and is about to depart for a writing workshop with Kurt Vonnegut. The two say goodbye and Preston walks away, but he then stops and runs back to Amanda and they share a kiss.

The epilogue explains what happened to all of the main characters:
 William became one of the most popular students at Harvard. He formed his own computer company that has made him worth millions, and he has been dating a supermodel.
 Mike went to college but, after drinking too much, lost his football scholarship. He ended up forty pounds overweight and working at a car wash, a job he lost when incriminating Polaroids surfaced.
 The day after the party, Denise and Kenny went to a diner; five minutes later, Denise dumped Kenny. Ten minutes later, they found a bathroom and got back together.
 Seven hours later, Preston finally boarded a train to Boston. Amanda wrote him a letter for every day that he was away. They are still together.

Cast

Production
The script for Can't Hardly Wait was originally written in 1996, by Harry Elfont and Deborah Kaplan who were looking for a project they could develop and direct themselves on a limited budget. The project was approved by Columbia Pictures in mid-1997, following the success of teen-oriented horror film Scream in early 1997.  Principal photography for Can't Hardly Wait started in October 1997, and ran for 26 days. Jennifer Love Hewitt was known for Party of Five when she signed on to the film, and appeared in the slasher hit I Know What You Did Last Summer, which helped to further raise her profile.  According to Charlie Korsmo, Adam Hann-Byrd was originally cast as William Lichter.

The cast had a week of rehearsals before filming.

The film initially received an R-Rating due to MPAA objections about the depiction of teens drinking alcohol at an unsupervised party and drug use. The film was recut to receive a PG-13 rating.

Reception

Box office
Can't Hardly Wait was released on June 12, 1998, and grossed $8,025,910 in its opening weekend. Its total domestic gross was $25,605,015, more than double its production budget.

Critical response
On Rotten Tomatoes the film holds an approval rating of 41% based on 63 reviews, with an average rating of 5.1/10. The site's consensus reads, "Occasionally clever and moderately intelligent, Can't Hardly Wait also contains too many cheap laughs, recycled plotting, and flat characters." On Metacritic the film has a weighted average score of 52 out of 100, based on 17 critics, indicating "mixed or average reviews". Audiences surveyed by CinemaScore gave the film a grade "B+" on scale of A to F.

Kevin Thomas of the Los Angeles Times wrote: "For all its nonstop energy and high spirits, Can't Hardly Wait allows its characters to emerge as fully dimensional individuals; they've been written with care and perception and played with equal aplomb by a roster of talented young actors".
Mick LaSalle of the San Francisco Chronicle wrote: "Can't Hardly Wait has freshness, comic invention and an engaging romantic spirit."
Stephen Thompson of The A.V. Club wrote: "But the film deserves credit, both for its breezy pacing and its uncommon tendency to make its characters smarter and geekier than they might have been."

Emanuel Levy of Variety called the film a "mediocre attempt to recapture the exuberance and candid portraiture of such high school movie classics as American Graffiti, Fast Times at Ridgemont High and Dazed and Confused." Levy praised the cast but was critical of the "uneven script and rough direction". Roger Ebert of the Chicago Sun-Times gave the film 1.5 stars out of 4, and wrote: "The kind of movie that somehow succeeds in moving very, very slowly even while proceeding at a breakneck pace. It cuts quickly back and forth between nothing and nothing... It doesn't have the zing of life and subversion that the best high school movies always have."

Awards
In 2012, Entertainment Weekly ranked Can't Hardly Wait number 44 on its list of the 50 Best High School Movies of all time.

 MTV Movie Awards
 Best Female Performance: (Jennifer Love Hewitt) Nominated
 Young Artist Awards
 Best Performance in a Feature Film — Leading Young Actress: (Jennifer Love Hewitt) Nominated

Sequel
On May 25, 2019, on Danny Pellegrino's Everything Iconic podcast, Jennifer Love Hewitt revealed that she is developing Can't Hardly Wait 2 with plans to direct it herself. The concept revolves around the reunion of the original high school gang from the 1998 film.

Home media
The film was released on VHS and DVD on November 17, 1998. On September 30, 2008, it was re-released on DVD and Blu-ray as the "10 Year Reunion Edition" to commemorate the film's 10th anniversary. The re-release included bonus features not on the original release. Mill Creek Entertainment reissued the DVD and Blu-ray on June 17, 2014 and October 30, 2018 respectively with the latter format billed as the "20 Year Reunion Edition".

Music

Soundtrack

Can't Hardly Wait: Music From The Motion Picture is the soundtrack of the film which was released on May 26, 1998 by Elektra Records. It peaked at number 25 on the Billboard 200 chart.

Featured music
Other music featured in the movie but not on the soundtrack includes:

 "London" – Third Eye Blind
 "Mandy" – Barry Manilow
 "Caress Me Down" – Sublime
 "Romeo and Juliet" – Dire Straits
 "6 Underground (The Umbrellas of Ladywell Mix # 2)" – Sneaker Pimps
 "Open Road Song" – Eve 6
 "I'll Make Love to You" – Boyz II Men
 "Wooly Imbibe" – Soul Coughing
 "Walkin' on the Sun" – Smash Mouth
 "Cold Beverage" – G. Love & Special Sauce
 "Ode" – Creed
 "How Do I Make You" – Jennifer Love Hewitt
 "Don't Leave Me This Way" – Thelma Houston
 "All Mixed Up" – 311
 "More Human than Human" – White Zombie
 "Inside Out" – Eve 6
 "Get It On" – Kingdom Come
 "Bust a Move" – Young MC
 "Groove Is in the Heart" (The Deee-Remix) – Deee-Lite
 "The Mac" – Dr. Freeze
 "Funky Cold Medina" – Tone Lōc
 "Ghost Radio" – Brian Setzer Orchestra
 "Lucas with the Lid Off" – Lucas
 "Love Hurts" – Nazareth
 "Waiting for a Girl Like You" – Foreigner
 "Sugar Cane" – Space Monkeys
 "Funk #49" – James Gang
 "When Will I See You Again" – The Three Degrees
 "Only You" – Yazoo

Certifications

References

External links

 
 

1998 films
1998 directorial debut films
1990s coming-of-age comedy films
1998 romantic comedy films
1990s teen comedy films
1990s teen romance films
American coming-of-age comedy films
American romantic comedy films
American teen comedy films
American teen romance films
Columbia Pictures films
Coming-of-age romance films
1990s English-language films
Films directed by Deborah Kaplan
Films directed by Harry Elfont
Films scored by David Kitay
Teen sex comedy films
Films about parties
Films set in California
Films shot in Los Angeles
1990s American films